Manton railway station or Manton Junction is a former railway station which served the villages of Manton and Wing in the county of Rutland.

History
Opened in 1848 by the Syston and Peterborough Railway, the station was situated off the road connecting the two villages and was just over a mile from each, or just over half a mile by the public footpaths that were soon established. It was one of only a handful of stations in the small county of Rutland; only  is still open.

In 1879 Manton became a junction when the Nottingham direct line of the Midland Railway was opened. This provided the Midland Railway with a new main line to Nottingham. 

The station closed in 1966 and the station buildings are now used as a small industrial area. The signal box controlling the nearby junction is still operational.

The Oakham–Kettering line closed to passengers in 1967 but reopened in 2009 with currently two trains in each direction. The line remains important for freight and is occasionally used as a diversionary route for main-line passenger trains.

Accidents 
On 1 February 1853 a late running goods train detached a wagon at Manton. A passenger train collided with it in dense fog.

On 28 January 1889, Thomas Shilcock was cleaning a set of points near the tunnel mouth. To avoid a passing train he stepped onto the other line where he was struck by another train emerging from the tunnel. He was killed immediately.

Stationmasters

William Ward until 1861 (afterwards station master at Stamford)
Henry Prime 1861 - 1864 (formerly station master at Ketton)
J. Orton from 1864 
John Herbert until 1875 (afterwards station master at Hassop)
Alexander McCall 1875 - 1876 (formerly station master at Melbourne, afterwards station master at Finchley Road)
George Allen 1876 - 1877
William Mee 1877 - 1882 (afterwards station master at Olney)
William Glisbey 1882 - 1908
Henry E. Haines 1908 - 1921 (formerly station master at Helpston)
William Slater 1921 - 1928 (formerly station master at Oakley, afterwards station master at Olney)
A. Alexander until 1946 (formerly station master at Frisby-on-the-Wreake)
R.C.T. Wilson until 1950 (afterwards station master at Shefford)
C.J.B. Wakefield until 1966

References

External links
Syston and Peterborough line

Disused railway stations in Rutland
Railway stations in Great Britain opened in 1848
Railway stations in Great Britain closed in 1966
Former Midland Railway stations
Beeching closures in England